Šárka Musilová (born 6 January 1991) is a Czech Paralympic archer.

In the 2016 Summer Paralympics, her debut games, Musilova won her first Paralympic medal which was bronze.

References

External links
 

Living people
Czech female archers
1991 births
Paralympic medalists in archery
Paralympic archers of the Czech Republic
Archers at the 2016 Summer Paralympics
Archers at the 2020 Summer Paralympics
Medalists at the 2016 Summer Paralympics
Medalists at the 2020 Summer Paralympics
Paralympic silver medalists for the Czech Republic
Paralympic bronze medalists for the Czech Republic
People from Trutnov
Sportspeople from the Hradec Králové Region